DJ-Kicks: Erlend Øye is a DJ mix album, mixed by Erlend Øye. It was released on 19 April 2004 on the Studio !K7 independent record label as part of the DJ-Kicks series. All vocals on the a cappella tracks are performed by Øye. The release was preceded on April 12 by the single "The Black Keys Work", a remix of which appears on the album. Also released was a promotional 12'' vinyl single for "Sheltered Life/Fine Day".

The album was awarded a silver certification from the Independent Music Companies Association which indicated sales of at least 30,000 copies throughout Europe.

Reception

Online music magazine Pitchfork placed Erlend Øye's DJ-Kicks at number 148 on its list of top 200 albums of the 2000s.

Track listing

Charts

References

Erlend Øye albums
Erlend Oye
2004 compilation albums